Hare on Ball and Claw is a 1989–1990 bronze sculpture by Barry Flanagan, installed outside the Columbus Museum of Art in Columbus, Ohio, United States. The sculpture, installed in 1997, measures approximately 132 x 48 x 36 inches and rests on a base that measures approximately 32 x 43 x 45.5 in.

References

1990 sculptures
Animal sculptures in the United States
Bronze sculptures in Ohio
Columbus Museum of Art
Downtown Columbus, Ohio
Outdoor sculptures in Columbus, Ohio
Rabbits and hares in art
Statues in Columbus, Ohio